Zongo is an impact crater in the Argyre quadrangle of Mars, located at 33.8°S and 41.7°W.  It is  in diameter and was named after Zongo, a town in the Democratic Republic of the Congo.

See also
 List of craters on Mars: O-Z

References 

Argyre quadrangle
Impact craters on Mars